Carlsruhe is a town in the Shire of Macedon Ranges between Woodend and Kyneton, alongside the old Calder Highway, although now bypassed by the Calder Freeway. It is approximately 50 minutes from both Melbourne and Bendigo.

History
Carlsruhe was settled for European use on 26 May 1837 by Charles Ebden. Carlsruhe was the second inland settlement in the Port Phillip District, Ebden having set up the first inland settlement on about 14 March 1837 at Sugarloaf Creek, Victoria. It was named after Karlsruhe, Germany, where Ebden received part of his education.

Although Carlsruhe is named after the German city, the German pronunciation of the name is very different from the Australian town which is pronounced using English spelling conventions. This is because in German the final "e" is pronounced with an "E" sound, whereas in English the "e" it is silent when at the end of a word. The correct German pronunciation is "Carls-ruh-e".

Carlsruhe has a graveyard with many tombstones dating back to the 19th century.

A township was established in the 1850s; the post office opened on 1 September 1854, closed after a few months and reopened in 1858. After the railway arrived in 1862, Carlsruhe Railway Station post office opened some distance away, in October 1865. The original Carlsruhe post office closed in 1957; in July 1958 the name of the Railway Station post office was changed to Carlsruhe; this office closed in March 1965.

Gallery

See also
 Carlsruhe railway station

References

External links
Charles Hotson Ebden in Australian Dictionary of Biography 
Pictures, history, maps etc.

Towns in Victoria (Australia)
Shire of Macedon Ranges